U.S. Highway 161 (US 161) was a U.S. Highway in Iowa that ran from Keokuk to Dubuque by way of Cedar Rapids.  It was designated in 1925 and signed in 1926 along two primary highways.  The route began at the Missouri River with US 61 southwest of Keokuk ran north through Mount Pleasant and Iowa City to Cedar Rapids.  There, it turned to the northeast through Anamosa and Monticello towards Dubuque.  The route ended at US 61 in Key West, a few miles west of Dubuque.

The route changed very little while it was in service.  It was paved from end to end by the summer of 1932.  In January 1938, it was removed from the US Highway System.  From Keokuk to Cedar Rapids, it was replaced by US 218, which was extended southward.  From Cedar Rapids to Key West it was replaced by US 151, which was extended westward.

Route description
US 161 began on the US 61 bridge over the Des Moines River, which represents the border between Missouri and Iowa.  The two routes ran concurrently within  of the Mississippi River until they reached Keokuk, where the two routes turned to the northeast and turned away from the river.  As the highway curved to the north, it passed the now-unincorporated towns of Mooar and Summitville.  Southwest of Montrose, US 61 split off to the northeast to run along the banks of the Mississippi.

After the US 61 split, US 161 continued northeast towards Donnellson along Main Street where it met Iowa Highway 3 (Iowa 3).  North of Donnellson, the highway diverted away from the Keokuk and Northwestern Railroad, which the highway had theretofore closely paralleled the railway.  As the highway headed due north towards Mount Pleasant, it passed many small communities, but did not enter any of them.  West of West Point, it intersected Iowa 103, which served as a shortcut to Fort Madison until 2003.  Iowa 16 intersected the highway in northern Lee County.

Shortly after it entered Henry County, US 161 intersected Iowa 125, a short spur highway that connected Salem to the primary highway system.  The road headed due north, jogging to the east only slightly to cross the Skunk River.  In Mount Pleasant, it intersected US 34 and Iowa 133.  Further north, it briefly overlapped Iowa 78 near Olds.

In Washington County, US 161 only intersected two primary highways: Iowa 2 near Ainsworth and Iowa 22 near Riverside.  In Johnson County, the highway entered the Iowa City area from the south.  Iowa 1 joined US 161 from the southwest and the two routes briefly headed north together.  At the banks of the Iowa River, they were joined by US 6, and all three routes crossed the river.  US 6 split away from the two routes near the University of Iowa Pentacrest.  A few blocks north of campus, Iowa 1 split away to the east.  A few more blocks north was the southern end of Iowa 261.  North of Iowa City, the highway crossed back over the Iowa River and headed to the northwest towards North Liberty, where it intersected Iowa 153.

US 161 continued to the northwest before turning north at its last Iowa River crossing.  It passed through Shueyville and entered Linn County.  It entered the Cedar Rapids area from the southwest side, where it intersected US 30 and Iowa 64.  The three highways headed to the northeast towards and crossed the Cedar River before entering downtown.  East of downtown, US 30 split away to the east near the intersection with Iowa 11.  US 161 and Iowa 64 continued northeast towards Marion, where they met Iowa 94 near its downtown.  Outside of Marion, they intersected Iowa 13.

Southwest of Anamosa, the two routes met the northern end of Iowa 261.  Closer to Anamosa, they crossed the Wapsipinicon River before Iowa 64 split away to the east.  Now heading northeast, US 161 traversed the farmland of Jones County.  In Monticello, it met the ends of Iowa 38 and Iowa 113.  It crossed the South Fork Maquoketa River and headed towards Cascade, where it crossed the north fork of the river.  At Cascade, US 161 met the ends of Iowa 136 and Iowa 188.  Now in Dubuque County, the highway continued northeast past the New Melleray Abbey.  The route ended at an intersection with US 61 in Key West, a few miles west of Dubuque.

History
US 161 was an original U.S. Highway; it and the rest of the system were designated in 1925 and were signed by the summer of 1926.  US 161 replaced parts of two primary roads in eastern Iowa – Primary Road No. 40, which was known as the Red Ball Route, from Keokuk to Cedar Rapids, and Primary Road No. 28, parts of which were known as the Red X Route.  The northernmost  of US 161 were a part of a territorial and military road from Dubuque to Iowa City.  This road, authorized by President Martin Van Buren in 1839, was known as Dillon's Furrow, named after the Dubuque merchant Lyman Dillon who surveyed the route and marked it with a furrow.

Upon designation, only a small portion of US 161 was paved, all of which was located in and around Cedar Rapids.  A short section in Keokuk and the remainder of the route north of Cedar Rapids was graveled, but not paved.  A $100 million bond bill ($ in  dollars) passed and approved by a plebiscite in 1928 allowed paving to commence in earnest.  The entire routing of US 161 was to be completed within six years.  Paving work progressed faster in some counties than it did in others.  By 1930, a hard-surfaced road existed from the Missouri state line to Olds in Henry County and from Iowa City to northeast of Cascade in Dubuque County.  All  of the route were paved by June 1932.

In January 1938, US 161 was removed from the U.S. Highway System.  From Keokuk to Cedar Rapids, it was replaced by US 218, which had previously ended at US 30 south of Vinton.  US 218 was extended eastward along US 30 and then southward towards Keokuk.  From Cedar Rapids to Key West, it was replaced by US 151, which had previously only existed in Wisconsin.  US 151 was routed westward from Madison along US 18 to Dodgeville, then along US 118 to Dickeyville, then along US 61 into Iowa to Key West, and then along US 161 to Cedar Rapids.

Major intersections

References

U.S. Highways in Iowa
1
Former U.S. Highways
United States Numbered Highway System